Misprision of treason is an offence found in many common law jurisdictions around the world, having been inherited from English law. It is committed by someone who knows a treason is being or is about to be committed but does not report it to a proper authority.

Australia
Under Australian law a person is guilty of misprision of treason if he:

The maximum penalty is life imprisonment.

Canada
Under section 50(1)(b) of the Canadian Criminal Code, a person is guilty of an offence (although it is not described as misprision) if: 

The maximum penalty is 14 years.

Republic of Ireland
Under section 3 of the Treason Act 1939 a person is guilty of misprision of treason if "knowing that any act the commission of which would be treason is intended or proposed to be, or is being, or has been committed, [he] does not forthwith disclose the same, together with all particulars thereof known to him, to a Justice of the District Court, or an officer of the Gárda Síochána, or some other person lawfully engaged on duties relating to the preservation of peace and order."

New Zealand
Section 76(b) of the Crimes Act 1961 provides that any person who "knowing that a person is about to commit treason, fails without reasonable excuse to inform a constable as soon as possible or to use other reasonable efforts to prevent its commission" is guilty of an offence.

A person guilty of this offence is liable to imprisonment for a term not exceeding seven years.

Russia
Russia has no specific offence of misprision. However Article 275 of the Criminal Code of Russia encourages people to come forward with information by providing them with a statutory defence to treason and other offences:

United Kingdom
Misprision of treason is an offence under the common law of England and Wales and the common law of Northern Ireland.  By statute, the offence of misprision of treason under the common law of England has been made an offence which is cognisable under the law of Scotland. This offence was formerly known as misprision of high treason in order to distinguish it from misprision of petty treason, before that offence was abolished along with its parent offence in 1828.

The crime is committed where a person knows that treason is being planned or committed and does not report it as soon as he can to a justice of the peace or other authority. The offender does not need to consent to the treason; mere knowledge is enough. Concealment of treason was itself a treason at common law until the Treason Act 1554 deemed it merely misprision of treason, which was a felony.

Difference from treason
In R v. Tonge (1662) 6 State Tr 225, it was said that:

(For more information about the "Tonge Plot", see Intelligence and Espionage in the Reign of Charles II, 1660–1685 (Marshall, 1994)).

Similarly, in R v. Walcott (1683) 9 State Tr 519 at 553, Pemberton, LCJ. said:

Penalty
It is punishable by imprisonment for life.

Procedure
The procedure on trials for misprision of treason is the same as that on trials for murder. It is classified as an indictable-only offence.

Limitation
A person may not be indicted for misprision of treason committed within the United Kingdom unless the indictment is signed within three years of the commission of that offence.

Scottish Parliament
Misprision of treason is a reserved matter on which the Scottish Parliament cannot legislate.

United States
In the United States misprision of treason is a federal offense, committed where someone who has knowledge of the commission of any treason against the United States, conceals such knowledge and does not inform the President, a federal judge, a State governor, or a State judge. It is punishable by a fine and up to seven years in federal prison. It is also a crime punishable under the criminal laws of many states.

California
Misprision of treason in California consists of:

Treason in the aforementioned quote only refers to treason against California, not treason against the United States or any other entity.

The crime is punishable by imprisonment pursuant to subdivision (h) of Section 1170 in a county jail for 16 months, or two or three years.

See also
Misprision
Misprision of felony
Treason
Compounding treason

Notes

References
 Halsbury's Laws of England, 4th Edition, 2006 reissue, Volume 11(1), Paragraphs 365 and 366
 J G Bellamy, The Law of Treason in England in the Later Middle Ages, CUP, Appendix I (2004 ed.) .
 William Blackstone, Commentaries on the Laws of England, Book 4, Chapter 9, paragraphs 120–121 (1867 ed.)  (from Google Books).
 Edward Coke, Institutes of the Laws of England, Part 3, Chapter 3 (p.36) (1797 ed.)  (from Google Books).
 Edward Hyde East, Treatise of Pleas of the Crown, Volume 1, Chapter 3 (pp. 139–140) (1806 ed.)  (from Google Books).
 Matthew Hale, Historia Placitorum Coronæ (History of Pleas of the Crown), Volume 1, Chapter 28, paragraphs 371 to 377 (1800 ed.)  (from Google Books).
 William Hawkins, Treatise of Pleas of the Crown, Book 1, Part 1, Chapter 5 (pp. 60–61) (1824 ed.)  (from Google Books).

Common law
Crimes
Criminal law
Deception
English law
Inchoate offenses
Treason
United States federal law
Common law offences in England and Wales